AMD Cool'n'Quiet is a CPU dynamic frequency scaling and power saving technology introduced by AMD with its Athlon XP processor line. It works by reducing the processor's clock rate and voltage when the processor is idle. The aim of this technology is to reduce overall power consumption and lower heat generation, allowing for slower (thus quieter) cooling fan operation. The objectives of cooler and quieter result in the name Cool'n'Quiet. The technology is similar to Intel's SpeedStep and AMD's own PowerNow!, which were developed with the aim of increasing laptop battery life by reducing power consumption.

Due to their different usage, Cool'n'Quiet refers to desktop and server chips, while PowerNow! is used for mobile chips; the technologies are similar but not identical. This technology was also introduced on "e-stepping" Opterons, however it is called Optimized Power Management, which is essentially a re-tooled Cool'n'Quiet scheme designed to work with registered memory.

Cool'n'Quiet is fully supported in the Linux kernel from version 2.6.18 onward (using the powernow-k8 driver) and FreeBSD from 6.0-CURRENT onward.

Implementation
In-order to take advantage of Cool'n'Quiet Technology in Microsoft's Operating Systems:
 Cool'n'Quiet should be Enabled in system BIOS
 In Windows XP and 2000: Operating Systems "Minimal Power Management" profile must be active in "Power Schemes". A PPM driver was also released by AMD that facilitates this.
 In Windows Vista and 7: "Minimum processor state" found in "Processor Power Management" of "Advanced Power Settings" should be lower than "100%".
Also In Windows Vista and 7 the "Power Saver" power profile allows much lower power state (frequency and voltage) than in the "High Performance" power state.

Unlike Windows XP, Windows Vista only supports Cool'n'Quiet on motherboards that support ACPI 2.0 or later.

With earlier versions of Windows, processor drivers along with Cool'n'Quiet software also need to be installed. The latest version is 1.3.2.0.

Third party utilities
In addition to the CPU drivers offered by AMD, several motherboard manufacturers have released software to give the end user more control over the Cool 'n' Quiet feature, as well as the other new features of AMD processors and chipsets. Using these applications, one can even control the CPU voltage explicitly.

 PhenomMsrTweaker (SourceForge link)
 RMClock

Processors supporting Cool'n'Quiet

 Athlon XP
 Athlon 64 and X2 – all models
 Athlon 64 FX – FX-53 (Socket 939 only) and higher
 FX (Socket 942)
 Athlon II – all models
 Sempron – Socket 754: 3000+ and higher; Socket AM2: 3200+ and higher
 Opteron – E-stepping and higher, branded as Optimized Power Management
 Phenom – all versions support Cool'n'Quiet 2.0
 Phenom II – supports Cool'n'Quiet 3.0
 some of the APUs
 Ryzen – 3, 5, 7, and 9 all models support Cool ‘n’ Quiet
 EPYC

See also
 Dynamic frequency scaling
Power Saving Technologies:
 AMD PowerNow! (laptop CPUs)
 AMD PowerTune/AMD PowerPlay (graphics)
 AMD PowerXpress (multi-graphics)
 Intel SpeedStep (CPUs)
Performance Boosting Technologies:
 AMD Turbo Core (CPUs)
 Intel Turbo Boost (CPUs)

References

External links
 AMD Cool'n'Quiet 2002
 Phenommsrtweaker
 Custom Cool'n'Quiet

Computer hardware tuning
AMD technologies
Clock signal
2002 introductions
X86 architecture